Yousuf Al-Hammad (born 4 May 1964) is a Kuwaiti judoka. He competed at the 1984 Summer Olympics and the 1988 Summer Olympics.

References

External links
 

1964 births
Living people
Kuwaiti male judoka
Olympic judoka of Kuwait
Judoka at the 1984 Summer Olympics
Judoka at the 1988 Summer Olympics
Place of birth missing (living people)